Porte-de-Savoie is a commune in the Savoie department in the Auvergne-Rhône-Alpes region in south-eastern France. It was established on 1 January 2019 by merger of the former communes of Les Marches (the seat) and Francin.

See also
Communes of the Savoie department

References

Communes of Savoie
States and territories established in 2019